The Serengeti Express, formerly known as the Trans Veldt Railway, is a  narrow gauge heritage railroad and amusement park attraction located within the Busch Gardens Tampa Bay amusement park in Tampa, Florida. It uses three trains pulled by one of four 4-4-0 type steam locomotives manufactured by Crown Metal Products.

Locomotives

See also
Florida Railroad Museum
Walt Disney World Railroad
Wildlife Express Train

References

External links

1971 establishments in Florida
3 ft gauge railways in the United States
Heritage railroads in Florida
Narrow gauge railroads in Florida
Passenger rail transportation in Florida
Railroads of amusement parks in the United States
Railway lines opened in 1971
Transportation in Tampa, Florida